Candice Lynn Odgers (born 1976) is a developmental and quantitative psychologist who studies how early adversity and exposure to poverty influences adolescent mental health. Her team has developed new approaches for studying health and development using mobile devices and online tools, with a focus on how digital tools and spaces can be improved to support children and adolescents. Odgers is currently a professor of Psychological Science at the University of California, Irvine and a research professor at Duke University. Odgers is also the co-director of the Child and Brain Development Program at the Canadian Institute for Advanced Research.

Odgers has received multiple awards for her research including the 2016 Advanced Research Fellowship from Klaus J. Jacobs Foundation, 2015 Distinguished Contributions to Psychology in the Public Interest Early Career Award from the American Psychological Association, 2014 William T. Grant Scholar Award, 2012 Janet Taylor Spence Award from the Association for Psychological Science, and 2005 Alice Wilson Award from the Royal Society of Canada.

Biography 
Odgers played college basketball and attended Simon Fraser University, where she received her undergraduate degree in Criminology and Psychology. Her brother is Jeff Odgers a NHL Hockey Player.

Odgers obtained a Honors and Masters level degree from Simon Fraser University (SFU) in 2001 and was awarded with the Terry Fox Medal  for overcoming adversity following a serious motor vehicle accident while traveling with the Women's Basketball Team at SFU. Odgers was awarded a Commonwealth Fellowship to continue her studies at Cambridge University, but pursued a PhD in psychology at the University of Virginia.

Odgers completed her postdoctoral training in England at the Social, Genetic, & Developmental Psychiatry Centre with Terrie Moffitt and Avshalom Caspi, during which time she helped to create a 'genes-to-geography' data archive for 2,232 children from the Environmental-Risk Longitudinal Twin Study.

In 2007, Odgers began a faculty position at the University of California, Irvine. In 2012 she became the associate director at the Center for Child and Family Policy at Duke University and a professor of Public Policy, Psychology & Neuroscience. Odgers became a Fellow, for the Association for Psychological Science in 2013, and a Fellow at the Child Brain & Development Program Canadian Institute for Advanced Research in 2016. She is currently a psychology professor at the University of California-Irvine and Duke University.

References

External links 
 Faculty page
 

1976 births
Living people
Simon Fraser University alumni
University of Virginia alumni
American women psychologists
21st-century American psychologists
University of California, Irvine faculty
Duke University faculty
American women academics
21st-century American women